National Housing Authority may refer to:

National Housing Authority (Albania)
National Housing Authority (Bangladesh)
National Housing Authority (Philippines)